Atlanta Blue is the twenty-fifth studio album by American country music group The Statler Brothers. It was released in 1984 via Mercury Records. The album peaked at number 177 on the Billboard 200 chart.

Track listing
"Atlanta Blue" (Don Reid) – 2:47
"If It Makes Any Difference" (D. Reid, Harold Reid) – 3:32
"(Let's Just) Take One Night at a Time" (Kim Reid) – 2:28
"Angel in Her Face" (D. Reid) – 3:07
"Hollywood" (D. Reid) – 2:48
"One Takes the Blame" (D. Reid) – 3:30
"Give It Your Best" (D. Reid) – 3:14
"No Love Lost" (Jimmy Fortune, John Rimel) – 3:31
"One Size Fits All" (Rimel) – 2:25
"My Only Love" (Fortune) – 3:15

Charts

Weekly charts

Year-end charts

References

1984 albums
The Statler Brothers albums
Mercury Records albums
Albums produced by Jerry Kennedy